Deborah Owusu-Bonsu (born 25 August 1984) better known by her stage name as Sister Derby is a Ghanaian-Romanian television presenter, musician and model of Akan origin and a former presenter at e.tv Ghana.

Early life and education
Deborah Vanessa Owusu-Bonsu was born on 25 August 1984, to an Ashanti father and a Romanian mother. Both of her parents were collectors of world music and art. She is a television show host, model, musician, academic and graphic artist. Owusu-Bonsu is the sister of popular hip life musician Wanlov the Kubolor who starred in the film Coz Ov Moni. Owusu-Bonsu attended Christ the King International School, then Wesley Girls' High School. Owusu-Bonsu graduated with a Bachelor's Degree in Publishing Studies from the Kwame Nkrumah University of Science and Technology followed by a Master Degree in Book/Journal Publishing from the University of the Arts London.

Professional career 
Ms. Owusu-Bonsu has shown her professionalism and passion for her chosen field by working successfully for both small enterprises as well as big corporations in Ghana, the United States and the United Kingdom. In 2012, Owusu-Bonsu recorded and released a single (music) entitled 'Uncle Obama' referring to Barack Obama in which was covered by United States television network CNN. Since 2012, Owusu-Bonsu was the host of The Late Nite Celebrity Show program broadcast by television network e.tv Ghana. She later moved to GHOne Television where she hosted her show, Gliterrati for a brief period before handing over to Berla Mundi.

Personal life 
She dated rapper Medikal for three years, before breaking up in 2018.

Activism 
Deborah Vanessa has been actively involved in sanitation and recycling campaigns using her music. In 2018, she made a call on the government of Ghana to use of plastic bags. In 2020, during the COVID-19 pandemic, she and her brother (Wanlov the Kubolor) made nosemasks from recycled secondhand clothing to help reduce clothing waste from dumpsites and the sea.

Deborah Vanessa has also been vocal about the rights of LGBT+ individuals in Ghana. In 2021, she spoke against the Ghanaian anti-LGBT bill and the shutting down of the LGBT+ Rights Ghana office. She also featured on Angel Maxine's Kill The Bill  and Wo Fie, which used music to advocate for the rights of LGBT+ individuals in Ghana.

Discography

Singles

References

1984 births
Akan people
Living people
Ghanaian television presenters
Ghanaian female models
Ghanaian musicians
Kwame Nkrumah University of Science and Technology alumni
Alumni of the University of the Arts London
Ghanaian people of Romanian descent
Ghanaian women academics
Ghanaian women television presenters